Blue's Clues is an American live-action/animated educational children's television series that premiered on Nickelodeon on Sunday, September 8, 1996. Producers Angela Santomero, Todd Kessler, and Traci Paige Johnson combined concepts from child development and early-childhood education with innovative animation and production techniques that helped their viewers learn. It was hosted originally by Steve Burns, who left in 2002 and was replaced by Donovan Patton. The show follows an animated blue-spotted dog named Blue as she leaves a treasure hunt for the host and the viewers. Blue's Clues became the highest-rated show for preschoolers on American commercial television and was critical to Nickelodeon's growth. It has been called "one of the most successful, critically acclaimed, and ground-breaking preschool television series of all time."

Series overview

Episodes

Pilot (1995)

Season 1 (1996–97)

Season 2 (1997–99)

Season 3 (1999–2001)

Season 4 (2001–02)

Season 5 (2002–03)

Season 6 (2004–06)

References

External links

Lists of American children's animated television series episodes
Lists of Nickelodeon television series episodes